"Lonely at the Top" is a song by The Ordinary Boys. It was released as the third single from their then-unreleased album How to Get Everything You Ever Wanted in Ten Easy Steps. It became the band's third UK Top 10 single, peaking at #10 in the UK Singles Chart.

References

The Ordinary Boys songs
2006 singles
2006 songs
Songs written by Mark Taylor (record producer)
Songs written by Preston (singer)